Pedro Lisímaco de Jesús Vílchez Vílchez (May 19, 1929 – February 19, 2013) was the first Roman Catholic Bishop and Bishop Emeritus of the Diocese of Jinotega.

Biography
He was born in Jinotega on May 19, 1929 to Fidel Vilchez Zelaya and Pastora Vilchez. He was baptized in the San Juan de Jinotega parish by the priest Alberto Valencia of that same year.

Ordained to the priesthood in 1958, he was named bishop of the Diocese of Jinotega, Nicaragua, in 1984 and retired in 2005.

Notes

1929 births
2013 deaths
20th-century Roman Catholic bishops in Nicaragua
21st-century Roman Catholic bishops in Nicaragua
Roman Catholic bishops of Jinotega